Lena Lowis (born Selina Caroline Shakespear; 3 November 1845, in India – 18 November 1919, in London) was an Indian-born writer, scientific and botanical illustrator, noted for her 1878 publication Familiar Indian Flowers which was advertised in The Times (London) in April 1881 as "with 30 coloured plates, 31s. 6d."

Family
Lena Lowis was the daughter of Sir Richmond Campbell Shakespear (1812–1861), an Indian-born British Indian Army officer, who had married Marian Sophia Thompson at Agra, India on 5 March 1844. Their children were
Richmond Shakespear b. 5 Dec 1844, d. 12 Aug 1865
Selina Caroline Shakespear b. 3 Nov 1845, d. 15 Nov 1919
Talbot Powney Shakespear b. 29 Jan 1847, d. 1896
Edith Shakespear b. 18 Mar 1849
Sophy Shakespear b. 20 Jan 1851
Annie Shakespear b. 10 Jan 1853, d. 22 Jul 1898
Emily Shakespear b. c 1856
John Shakespear b. 1 Sep 1861
Richard Shakespear d. 12 Aug 1865
Minna Shakespear

She was married to Lt.-Col. Ninian Lowis (1838–1914), son of John Lowis, on 30 July 1868 at Horsley, Gloucestershire and they had a family consisting of
Richmond Shakespear Lowis b. 25 Jul 1869
Lt.-Col. Penton Shakespear Lowis b. 17 Dec 1870, d. 10 Oct 1931
Edith Shakespear Lowis b. 1873, d. 17 Jun 1874
Ada Shakespear Lowis b. 1874
Ninian Lowis b. 23 Aug 1878

References

Botanical illustrators
1845 births
1919 deaths